The 2023 PDC Pro Tour is the current series of non-televised darts tournaments organised by the Professional Darts Corporation (PDC). Players Championships and European Tour events are the events that make up the Pro Tour. There will be thirty Players Championship events and thirteen PDC European Tour events, as well as 24 events for the Challenge and Development Tours, and the Women's Series.

Prize money
On 21 November 2022, it was announced that the prize money for the Women's Series will be doubled in 2023.

The following day, it was announced that the prize money for Challenge/Development Tour events would also increase, with the prize fund going up from £10,000 to £15,000 per event.

On 15 February 2023, it was announced that the prize money for the PDC European Tour events was to increase by 25% with prize funds increasing from £140,000 to £175,000 per event.

This is how the prize money is divided:

PDC Tour Card
128 players are granted Tour Cards, which enables them to participate in all Players Championships events, the UK Open and qualifiers for all European Tour and select televised events.

Tour cards

The 2023 Tour Cards were awarded to:
 (64) The top 64 players from the PDC Order of Merit after the 2023 World Championship. 
 (30) 30 qualifiers from 2022 Q-School not ranked in the top 64 of the PDC Order of Merit following the World Championship.
 (1) The winner of the 2021 UK Challenge Tour (Jim Williams).
Jim Williams is also in the top 64 of the PDC Order of Merit, and therefore, one extra Tour Card will be awarded to a Q-School qualifier.
 (1) The winner of the 2021 European Challenge Tour (Matt Campbell).
 (1) The winner of the 2021 UK Development Tour (Bradley Brooks).
 (1) The winner of the 2021 European Development Tour (Rusty-Jake Rodriguez).
 (2) Two highest qualifiers from 2022 Challenge Tour (Robert Owen and Danny van Trijp).
 (2) Two highest qualifiers from 2022 Development Tour (Geert Nentjes and Jurjen van der Velde).
 (8) The daily winners from the 2023 Q-Schools.

Afterwards, the playing field was complemented by the highest qualified players from the Q-School Order of Merit until the maximum number of 128 Pro Tour Card players has been reached. In 2023, that means that a total of 19 additional players qualified this way.

Q-School
The PDC Pro Tour Qualifying School (or Q-School) was split into a UK and European Q-School. Players that are not from Europe could choose which Q-School to compete in.

Q-School was once again split into two stages; with all players who lost their tour cards after the 2023 World Championship and the players who finished from third to sixteenth in the 2022 Challenge Tour and Development Tour Orders of Merit exempted to the final stage. The first stage consisted a block of three days, with the last eight players on each day qualifying into the final stage. A ranking of other players will also be produced with players qualifying via that ranking to produce a full list of 128 players for each final stage.

Stage One took place between 9–11 January; with the Final Stage being held between 12–15 January. The winner of each day's play in the Final Stage will be given a PDC Tour Card.

The UK Q-School was held at the Marshall Arena, Milton Keynes, England; with the European Q-School held at Wunderland Kalkar in Kalkar, Germany.

An Order of Merit was created for each Q School. For every win after the Last 64, the players will be awarded 1 point.

To complete the field of 128 Tour Card Holders, places will be allocated down the final Q-School Order of Merits in proportion to the number of participants, with 9 cards going to the UK Q-School and 10 going to the European Q-School.

The following players picked up Tour Cards as a result:

UK Q-School Order of Merit
 
 
 
 
 
 
 
 
 

European Q-School Order of Merit

Players Championships
There will be 30 Players Championship events in 2023.

PDC European Tour
The PDC European Tour will remain at 13 events for 2023, although there will be no event in Gibraltar, ending 10 years of darts on the peninsula.

PDC Challenge Tour
The 2023 Challenge Tour will once again consist of 4 weekends of 5 events, and 1 weekend of 4 events. The top 2 players on the Order of Merit get a PDC Tour Card and a place at the 2024 PDC World Darts Championship, meanwhile the winner of the Order of Merit gets a spot at the 2023 Grand Slam of Darts as well. The Challenge Tour rankings are additionally used to top up Players Championship events should not all 128 Tour Card holders choose to enter. Furthermore the top 8 ranked players from the 2023 Challenge Tour Order of Merit, who didn't have a Tour Card for the 2024 season, qualified for the first round of the 2024 UK Open.

PDC Development Tour
The 2023 Development Tour will once again consist of 4 weekends of 5 events, and 1 weekend of 4 events. The top 2 players on the Order of Merit get a PDC Tour Card and a place at the 2024 PDC World Darts Championship, meanwhile the winner of the Order of Merit gets a spot at the 2023 Grand Slam of Darts as well. The Development Tour rankings additionally form a large part of qualification for the 2023 PDC World Youth Championship. Furthermore the top 8 ranked players from the 2023 Development Tour Order of Merit, who didn't have a Tour Card for the 2024 season, qualified for the first round of the 2024 UK Open.

PDC Women's Series
The PDC Women's Series will be expanded from 20 to 24 events held over six weekends. The top 8 ranked players from money earned from the last 8 Women's Series events of 2022 and the first 12 events of 2023 will qualify for the 2023 Women's World Matchplay in Blackpool. The top two players from the series will qualify for the 2024 PDC World Darts Championship.

PDC Asian Tour
Following a break of three years, the PDC Asian Tour returns in 2023 with an expanded tour consisting of 24 events held over 8 weekends. The first 15 events were confirmed on 10 November 2022, with the remaining 9 to be confirmed at a later date.

The Asian Championship will also return, this time taking place in Shimonoseki between 5–8 October.

Professional Darts Corporation Nordic & Baltic (PDCNB) Tour
On 15 January 2023, PDC Nordic & Baltic announced their 2023 calendar, which had 5 weekends in 5 different countries.

Dartplayers Australia (DPA) Pro Tour
The Dartplayers Australia Tour will return to a unified tour for 2023. There will be 20 events held over 5 weekends, all held at the Warilla Bowls Club, Barrack Heights.

Dartplayers New Zealand (DPNZ) Pro Tour
The Dartplayers New Zealand Tour will return for an extended tour for 2023. There will be 12 events held over 6 weekends.

Championship Darts Corporation (CDC) Pro Tour
The Championship Darts Corporation will continue in 2023. It will host 12 events held over 4 weekends. The top players from the United States and Canada on the Tour Points List will qualify for the 2024 PDC World Darts Championship.

Before the CDC season starts, there will also be a new tournament called the Cross-Border Darts Challenge featuring 8 players from both Canada and the United States facing off against each other, with the winner earning a place at the 2023 US Darts Masters. The event will take place at White Eagle Hall in Jersey City, New Jersey on 21–22 April.

African Continental Tour
On 15 February 2023, it was announced that in co-operation with the African Darts Group, a first ever African Continental Tour would take place. It would include qualifiers for the 2023 PDC World Cup of Darts, as well as the 2023 PDC World Youth Championship and the 2024 PDC World Darts Championship.

References

 
PDC Pro Tour
2023 in darts
PDC